Cheshmeh-ye Salim (also Romanized as Cheshmeh-ye Salīm; also known as Chashmā, Chashmeh ‘Alī, and Cheshmeh) is a village in Birk Rural District, in the Central District of Mehrestan County, Sistan and Baluchestan Province, Iran. At the 2006 census, its population was 25, in 4 families.

References 

Populated places in Mehrestan County